Dora Schönemann (born 1911, date of death unknown) was a German swimmer. She competed in the women's 400 metre freestyle event at the 1928 Summer Olympics. In 1928, Schönemann became the German national champion in the 400m freestyle.

References

External links
 

1911 births
Year of death missing
German female swimmers
Olympic swimmers of Germany
Swimmers at the 1928 Summer Olympics
Swimmers from Dresden